Spanish people may refer to:

 in terms of ethnicity: all ethnic Spaniards, in and outside of Spain 
 in territorial terms: people of Spain, entire population of Spain, historical or modern
 in modern legal terms: all people who poses the citizenship of Spain

Other uses 
 Spanish People's Party, a political party in Spain
 Spanish People's Union, a political party in Spain

See also 
 Spanish (disambiguation)
 Spain (disambiguation)